Ballybeg is a townland in the civil parish of Twomileborris, County Tipperary, Ireland.

References

Townlands of County Tipperary